Heavener can refer to:
 David Heavener (born 1958), entertainer
 Heavener, Oklahoma, U.S.

See also
 Heavener Runestone, stones of modern origin found near Heavener, Oklahoma, U.S.
 Heavener High School, Heavener, Oklahoma, U.S.